There are several lakes named Mud Lake within the U.S. state of Ohio.

 Mud Lake, Ashland County, Ohio.		
 Mud Lake, Stark County, Ohio.		
 Mud Lake, Summit County, Ohio.		
 Mud Lake, Summit County, Ohio.		
 Mud Lake, Williams County, Ohio.

References
 USGS-U.S. Board on Geographic Names

Lakes of Ohio